Michel Merlet (born 26 May 1939) is a French composer and pedagogue.

Biography 
Born in Saint-Brieuc, Merlet studied music at the Conservatoire de Paris, where his teacher was Tony Aubin. There he won prizes for harpsichord, chamber music, counterpoint, fugue, musical composition and musical analysis (in Olivier Messiaen's class). From 1978, he taught fugue there, succeeding Yvonne Desportes at this post. 

He won the Grand Prix de Rome in 1966.

In 1979, he was in charge of teaching music writing at the International Japanese Summer Academy, and from 1985, he taught writing, orchestration, analysis and composition in China at the Shanghai Conservatory and the Beijing Conservatory.

He has been professor of composition at the École Normale de Musique de Paris and at the Schola Cantorum de Paris.

In 1995, invited to Greece, he taught composition and orchestration at the Athens Conservatoire. In 2001, the "European American Musical Alliance" commissioned him to conduct masterclasses for students at several universities in the United States, including the Juilliard School.

Merlet is a member of the juries of numerous international competitions, including the Long-Thibaud-Crespin Competition.

Main works 
Prélude for piano, 1961
Gravitations for voice and piano, 1962
Suite for oboe, clarinet and bassoon, 1962
Sonate for violin and piano, 1963
Trio à cordes (theme and variations), 1963
Diptyque, for voice and piano, 1963
Sonatine for piano, 1965
Huit études for string quartet, 1965
Triptyque symphonique, 1965
En tous sens for flute and piano, 1966
Stabile for clarinet and piano, 1967
Musique for two pianos, 1967
Monde s'ouvre for trumpet and piano, 1967
Sonatine en trois mouvements for flute and piano, 1968
Hommage à Manuel De Falla for harpsichord, 1969
Divertimento da camera for String Orchestra, 1970
Ils étaient trois petits enfants for vocal quartet, flute, two clarinets and bassoon, 1970
Chacone for flute and piano, 1970
Passacaille for harp, 1971
Images pour les contes du Chat Perché for concert accordion, 1972
Jeu de cartes for piano, 1973
Musique de scène for cello, 1974
Trio for piano, flute and cello, 1974
Moirures, symphonic poem for orchestra, 1976
Discours sur la méthode for piano for four hands, 1977
Tétrassonances for oboe and piano, 1977
Psalmos for String Orchestra, 1978
Une soirée à Nohant for cello and piano, 1979
Concert in quatro for violin and string orchestra, 1979
Une soirée à Nohant for cello and string orchestra, 1979
Vingt-quatre préludes for piano, 1980
Variations for saxophone quartet, 1981
Mini-suite for piano, 1982
Quatuor à cordes, 1983–85
Concerto for piano and String Orchestra, 1984
Passacaille et fugue for piano, 1986
Ostinato for viola and piano, 1986
Cinq motets a cappella, 1987
Prélude-Interlude-Postlude for cello and piano, 1988
Concerto for two pianos and orchestra, 1989–92
Suite for String Trio, 1990
Étude miroir for harp sextet, 1994
Roque de sol-ut-ré for flute, 1995
Six études for violin, 1997–99
Six études symphoniques for piano, 2000
Pièce for balalaika and piano, 2001

Awards 
 1er Grand Prix International de la Guilde du disque (1965)
 Grand Prix de Rome (1966)
 Prix National Pineau-Chaillou (1966)
 Prix Jacques-Durand, décerné par L'Institut de France (1974)
 Prix Chartier, décerné par L'Institut de France (1976)
 Prix Stéphane-Chapelier, décerné par la SACEM (1977)
 Prix International de Naples (1987)

Distinctions 
Merlet is a Chevalier of the Ordre des Arts et des Lettres.

Recordings 
Le Trio, opus 24, la sonate pour piano et violon et Une soirée à Nohant ont été enregistrés par Pascal Devoyon, Jean-Jacques Kantorow and Philippe Muller during the 1980s. (Cybelia,CY 713, réédition Integral Classic)
 Éric Heidsieck a enregistré les 24 Préludes pour piano

References

Sources 
Notice of presentation of the recording of the vinyl disc referenced above, éditions Cybelia

1939 births
Living people
People from Saint-Brieuc
20th-century French composers
Conservatoire de Paris alumni
Academic staff of the École Normale de Musique de Paris
Academic staff of the Schola Cantorum de Paris
Prix de Rome for composition
Chevaliers of the Ordre des Arts et des Lettres